Ballad is a form of narrative poetry, often put to music, or a type of sentimental love song in modern popular music.

Ballad or Ballade may also refer to:

Music

Genres and forms
 Ballade (classical music), a musical setting of a literary ballad, or a romantic instrumental piece, especially for piano
 Ballade (forme fixe), a French poetic and musical form common in the 14th and 15th centuries
 Ballata, a similar Italian poetic and musical form
 Sentimental ballad, a style of popular music, in many genres, that often deals with romantic relationships
 Korean ballad, a genre popular since the 1980s
 Latin ballad, a genre that originated in the 1960s in Spain and Latin America

Classical compositions
 Ballad (John Ireland), a 1929 composition for piano by John Ireland
 Ballad, a composition by Stravinsky
 Ballad, a composition by Arnold Bax
 Ballad, a composition by Paul Ben-Haim
 Ballad, a composition by Eric Coates
 Ballad, a composition by Sibelius
 Ballade (Balanchine), a ballet by George Balanchine
 Ballade (Robbins), a ballet by Jerome Robbins
 Ballades, Op. 10 (Brahms)
 Ballades (Chopin), 1831–1842
 Ballade (Dvořák), 1884

Performers
 The Ballads (group), a 1960s American R&B vocal group

Albums
 Ballads (Mary J. Blige album), 2000
 Ballads (Liane Carroll album), 2013
 Ballads (John Coltrane album), 1962
 Ballads (David Murray album), 1988
 Ballads (Richard Marx album)
 Ballads (Despina Vandi album)
 Ballads (Earl Klugh album), 1993
 Ballads (Harem Scarem album), 1999
 Ballads (Paul Bley album), 1971
 Ballads (Ken Stubbs album), 2000
 Ballads, an album by Burl Ives
 Ballads - The Love Song Collection, a 2003 album by Boyzone
 The Ballads (Mariah Carey album), 2009
 The Ballads (REO Speedwagon album), 1999
 The Ballads (Doro album)
 Ballads 1, a 2018 album by Joji

Songs
 "Ballad" (Ayumi Hamasaki song), 2009
 "Ballad" (Namonaki Koi no Uta), by Alan, 2009
 "Ballad", by Vangelis from Spiral
 "The Ballad", by Bang Camaro from Bang Camaro
 "The Ballad", by Testament from Practice What You Preach

Other uses
 "Ballad" (Glee), a television episode
 Ballad, a 2009 movie starring Tsuyoshi Kusanagi
 Ballade, a typeface designed in 1938 by Paul Renner
 Honda Ballade, a compact car
 Ballade, a character from Mega Man IV and Mega Man V

See also
 Balada (disambiguation)
 Balad (disambiguation)
 Balade, a locality in New Caledonia
 Ballada (album), a 2014 album by Namie Amuro
 Ballard (disambiguation)